Pony Ma Huateng (born on October 29, 1971)  is a Chinese billionaire business magnate. He is the founder and chief executive officer of Tencent, one of the  most valuable companies in Asia, one of the largest internet and technology companies, and one of the biggest investment, gaming and entertainment conglomerates in the world. The company develops China's biggest mobile instant messaging service, WeChat, and its subsidiaries provide media, entertainment, payment systems, smartphones, internet-related services, value-added services and online advertising services, both in China and globally.

In 2007, 2014, and 2018, Time magazine named him one of the world's most influential people, while in 2015, Forbes credited him as one of the world's most powerful people. In 2017, Fortune ranked him as among the top businessmen of the year. In 2018, he was named one of the "Most Powerful People In The World" by the CEOWORLD magazine. Ma was a deputy to the Shenzhen Municipal People's Congress and a delegate in the 12th National People's Congress.

Being one of "Fortune world's greatest leaders", Ma is known for his low profile personality as compared to fellow Chinese businessman and Alibaba founder Jack Ma's outgoing personality. Ma has been compared to American investor Warren Buffett for their similar investment approaches, and often described as an "aggressive acquisitor".

As of January 2023, he has a net worth of US$43 billion according to Bloomberg Billionaires Index. Ma Huateng ranks fourth in the list of Forbes's China's 100 Richest, with a net worth of US$23.4 billion in December 2022.  In November 2017, his net worth briefly surpassed that of Larry Page and Sergey Brin (individually) ranking him the ninth richest man in the world, and the first citizen from China to enter Forbes''' top 10 richest list, though the net worth of Page and of Brin have each since eclipsed that of Ma.
 Early life and education 
Ma was born in Chaoyang, Shantou, Guangdong. When his father, Ma Chenshu, got a job as a port manager in Shenzhen, the young Ma accompanied him. He received a Bachelor of Science in computer and applied engineering from Shenzhen University in 1993.

Career
Founding of Tencent and early career
Ma's first job was with China Motion Telecom Development, a supplier of telecommunications services and products, where he was in charge of developing software for pagers. He reportedly earned $176 per month. He also worked for Shenzhen Runxun Communications Co. Ltd. in the research and development department for Internet calling services.

Along with four other classmates, Ma Huateng went on to co-found Tencent in 1998. The company's first product came after Ma participated in a presentation for ICQ, the world's first Internet instant messaging service, founded in 1996 by an Israeli company. Inspired by the idea, Ma and his team launched in February 1999 a similar software, with a Chinese interface and a slightly different name – OICQ (or, Open ICQ). The product quickly became popular and garnered more than a million registered users by the end of 1999, making it one of the largest such services in China.

Talking about the founding of Tencent, he told China Daily in a 2009 interview that "If I have seen further, it is by standing on the shoulders of giants", paraphrasing a quote attributed to Isaac Newton and referencing the similarities between ICQ and OICQ. "We knew our product had a future, but at that time we just couldn't afford it," Ma remembered. In order to solve the problem, Ma asked for bank loans and even talked about selling the company.

Since Tencent's prized service OICQ was offered free of charge, the company looked to venture capitalists to finance its growing operational costs. In 2000, Ma turned to US investment firm IDC and Hong Kong's telecom carrier Pacific Century CyberWorks (PCCW) who bought 40 percent of Tencent's shares for US$2.2 million. With the pager market declining, Ma improved the messaging platform by allowing QQ users to send messages to mobile handsets. Afterwards, 80 percent of the company's revenue came from deals struck with telecom operators who agreed to share message fees.

 AOL arbitration and business expansion 
After AOL (America Online) bought ICQ in 1998, the company filed an arbitration against Tencent with the National Arbitration Forum in the United States, claiming that OICQ's domain names OICQ.com and OICQ.net were in violation of ICQ's trademark. Tencent lost the case and had to relinquish the domain names. In December 2000, Ma changed the name of the software to QQ (with "Q" and "QQ" used to stand for the word "cute").

After the AOL case, Ma decided to expand the business portfolio of Tencent. In 2003, Tencent released its own portal (QQ.com) and made forays into the online games market. By 2004, Tencent became the largest Chinese instant messaging service (holding 74 percent of the market), prompting Ma to list the company on the Hong Kong Stock Exchange. After the company raised $200 million in June's IPO, Ma quickly became one of the richest people in China's telecom industry.

In 2004, Tencent launched an online gaming platform and started selling virtual goods to support the games published on that platform (weapons, gaming power), as well as emoticons and ringtones.

At Ma's behest, Tencent launched in 2005 the C2C platform Paipai.com, a direct competitor to e-commerce giant Alibaba.

Mimicking Microsoft, Ma created two competing teams of engineers in 2010 and charged them with creating a new product. After two months, one team presented an app for text messaging and group chat – WeChat – which launched in January 2011. , WeChat (Weixin), is the largest instant messaging platform in the world, used by 48 percent of Internet users in the Asia-Pacific region.

Other diverse services provided by Tencent include web portals, e-commerce, and multiplayer online games.[8] Online games such as Legend of Yulong and Legend of Xuanyuan boosted revenue by more than half, up to US$5.1 billion, with a US$1.5 billion profit margin.

In December 2015, Ma announced that Tencent would build an "internet hospital" set up in Wuzhen that will provide long-distance diagnoses and medicine delivery.

 Philanthropy 
In 2016, Ma transferred US$2.3 billion worth of his personal Tencent shares to his charitable foundation, the Ma Huateng Global Foundation. However Forbes'' has not decreased his net worth as the shares are still listed under his name.

Politics
According to the official Tencent website, Ma is a deputy to the 5th Shenzhen Municipal People's Congress and served in the 12th National People's Congress.

Speaking of censorship at a tech conference in Singapore, Ma was quoted as saying "In terms of information security management, online companies from any country must abide by a defined set of criteria, and act responsibly. Otherwise it might lead to hearsay, libel and argument among citizens - not to mention between countries. That's why the need for online management is increasingly urgent."

Personal life 
Ma uses the nickname Pony, derived from the English translation of his family name Ma, which means "horse." Ma Huateng seldom appears in the media and is known for his secretive lifestyle.

Ma Huateng's wealth comes from the 9.7 percent stake in Tencent Holdings. He reportedly owns property in Hong Kong and art pieces worth US$150 million.

References

1971 births
Living people
20th-century Chinese businesspeople
21st-century Chinese businesspeople
Billionaires from Guangdong
Businesspeople from Guangdong
Businesspeople from Hainan
Chinese chief executives
Chinese computer businesspeople
Chinese investors
Chinese software engineers
Chinese technology company founders
Delegates to the 12th National People's Congress
Delegates to the 13th National People's Congress
Shenzhen University alumni
Tencent people